An electrician is a tradesperson specializing in electrical wiring.

Electrician may also refer to:

 Electrician (theatre), a theatre worker that handles various aspects of lighting
 Electrician (video game), a 1984 platform game for the Atari
 The Electrician, a former scientific journal
 "The Electrician" (song), a 1978 song by Scott Walker
 An executioner who executes people using the electric chair